Rondocan District is one of seven districts of the province Acomayo in Peru.

Geography 
Other mountains are listed below:

Ethnic groups 
The people in the district are mainly indigenous citizens of Quechua descent. Quechua is the language which the majority of the population (97.42%) learnt to speak in childhood, 1.82% of the residents started speaking using the Spanish language (2007 Peru Census).

References

Districts of the Acomayo Province